The 2013 Penn Quakers football team represented the University of Pennsylvania in the 2013 NCAA Division I FCS football season. They were led by 22nd year head coach Al Bagnoli and played their home games at Franklin Field. They were a member of the Ivy League. They finished with a record of 4–6 overall and 3–4 in Ivy League play for three-way tie for fourth place. Penn averaged 11,936 fans per game.

Schedule

Coaching staff

Game summaries

September 21 vs. Lafayette

Improving to 4–0 when wearing their alternate red jerseys, the Quakers defeated the Lafayette Leopards 27–21 for the program's 820th overall win, 10th in the NCAA.

September 28 vs. Villanova

In their second game, Villanova trounced the Quakers at Villanova Stadium in a crosstown rivalry for the 12th consecutive season. Of the many shortcomings from Penn in the game, "all pale in comparison to what happened to Penn’s running game". They had a total of 21 carries for just 43 yards, averaging just over two yards per carry. Villanova's coach Andy Talley commented, "I just think our D-line played a little better than their O-line today." After the "reality check", the Quakers were set to begin their Ivy League slate.

References

Penn
Penn Quakers football seasons
Penn Quakers football